Tibor Kökény (born December 27, 1970 in Debrecen, Hungary) is a Hungarian psychologist and yoga teacher of Yoga in Daily Life System.

He finished as a psychologist in the University of Debrecen in 1998. Spent two times 6 months as a volunteer in Rajasthan, India in the Ashram Kailash of Paramhans Swami Maheshwarananda. He worked in Debrecen as a clinical psychologist and as an assistant professor in the Institute of Psychology, University of Debrecen.

Carrier 
He began to work part time as a psychologist in 1999 at the Department of Child and Youth Psychiatry of the Kenézy Hospital in Debrecen.  Almost at the same time he worked as a psychologist in Adult Psychiatric Care in Varga Street until 2002. Parallel he started to work for the Department of Personality and Clinical Psychology at the University of Debrecen, Psychology Institute from December 2000. His subjects were subjects of personality psychology, psychodiagnostics, crisis psychology, etc. He continued his university teaching activity until September 2011. In 2005 Tibor Kökény worked as a psychologist at the Heves City and Subregional Educational Advisory. From 2006 he became an EU Communication Expert in the framework of a project to modernize solid waste management in the framework of the ZALASIPA Waste Management Association.
As of 2011, he has been working as an EU expert in the framework of the Wastewater Disposal and Wastewater Treatment Program of Nyíregyháza and its region, which extends the liquid waste management of Nyíregyháza by 2015. From January 2016 until the mid-2016 he worked for the Female Handball Team of Ferencváros TC  to improve the performance of the athletes. From 2018 he works at the Department of Psychology and Sports Psychology at the University of Physical Education as a lecturer in various subjects.

Results connected to sport 
One year before the 2012 London Olympics, 10 km swimming Olympic Champion Éva Risztov, a later Olympic champion, visited the Yoga Club of the Ganga Friendship Circle in Debrecen, in order to improve her form with yoga practice. In special lectures in the Debreceni Sportuszoda  they practiced twice a week with Tibor Kökény. The yoga exercise portfolio included stretchings, relaxation and personalized breathing techniques and when it was necessary psychological support 

In 2013 Tibor Kökény helped Gábor Máthé to prepare for the Deaflympics in Sofia. The work included psychological support, sports psychology, yoga poses, relaxation and personalized breath techniques. As a result of well-timed joint work and serious training sessions, Gábor Máthé won gold medal in Sofia Deaflympics without a set loss.  Working for Ferencváros female handball team from January 2015, where the adult team won the national championship in the 2014/2015 season. He has also worked with a number of athletes, including running, scramble, chess, super moto, and fencers in the numbers.

Publications 
 2011. Nagy, T., Kökény, T: Stress Management (Hungarian)
 2011. Journey in My Scull (Hungarian)
 2009. History of Vegetarianism in Hungary. in: Társadalomkutatás, 27(2): 203-225
 2005. The Health Psychological Connections of Vegetarian Nourishment. in: Mentálhigiéné és Pszichoszomatika, 6(3): 231-243

Others 
 Craniosacral Therapy (level 1 & 2) (2012-2013)
 Yoga in Daily Life instructor trainer leader (2008-)
 Journalist (2003-). Main editor of the yoga magazine called Gyana Ganga ("River of Wisdom") since 2000.
 Sport Trainee of Recreation (2003-)
 Yoga in Daily Life Instructor (2000-)

References

External links 
 Paramhans Swami Maheshwarananda - Yoga in Daily Life 
 Risztov’s and Máthé's coach Tibor Kökény 
 Risztov Prepares with Yoga (Risztov jógával készül) 
 Hungarian Olympic Association on support of yoga 
 Gábor Máthé (tennis) Deaflympic Champion, Sofia 2013, tennis men's single
 Éva Risztov Olympic Champion, London 2012, 10km open water swimming

1970 births
Living people
People from Debrecen
People from Hajdú-Bihar County
Hungarian psychologists